Nepenthes undulatifolia is a tropical pitcher plant known only from South East Sulawesi, where it grows at an elevation of around 1800 m above sea level. The specific epithet undulatifolia refers to the wavy laminar margins of this species.

References

 Lee, C.C. 2012. New Pitcher Plant Discoveries. Jungle Notes, February 2, 2012. 
 McPherson, S.R. & A. Robinson 2012. Field Guide to the Pitcher Plants of Sulawesi. Redfern Natural History Productions, Poole.

Carnivorous plants of Asia
undulatifolia
Plants described in 2011